Burhanettin Duran (born 1971) is a Turkish political life scholar best known as author of academic studies on the transformation of political Islam under the rule of Justice and Development Party in Turkey. He is a former member of the Department of Political Science and International Relations at Istanbul Sehir University. He is currently the general director of the Foundation for Political, Economic and Social Research (SETA), an Ankara-based think tank funded by Turkish government.

Early years
Burhanettin Duran was born in 1971 in Adapazarı, Sakarya. Duran attended Adapazarı Imam Hatip school (now Adapazarı Anadolu Imam Hatip school), a lyce'e-level religious school, in Sakarya, graduated in 1989. In 1991, he established Sakarya İmam-Hatip Lisesi Mezunları ve Mensupları Derneği (SIMDER) (Association for Sakarya Imam Hatip High School Alumni) together with other alumni such as Atilla Arkan, and Kadir Ardic.

Duran received his BA from the Department of Political Science and International Relations at Boğaziçi University in 1993. He completed his MA in Bilkent University in 1994 with a thesis titled "Kenan Evren's and Turgut Özal's Conceptualizations of Secularism: A Comparative Perspective". Duran received his Ph.D. from the same university upon completion of his doctoral thesis titled "Transformation of Islamist political Thought in Turkey from the Empire to the Early Republic (1908-1960): Necip Fazıl Kısakürek's Political Ideas" in 2000. During his graduate education, he worked for Bilkent as a research assistant.

Sakarya University
Between 1993 and 2001, Duran served as a research assistant in the Department of Public Administration in Sakarya University. From 2001-2001, Duran was a member of the faculty of Department of International Relations, Sakarya University. He became an associate professor in 2006 in Sakarya University. From 2006–2009, he served as the head of the Department of International Relations.

In 2003, Duran, with his colleagues from Sakarya University and friends from Sakarya, established BilgiEvi (House of Knowledge), a civil society organization focusing on education and cultural activities. Its name was changed as Sakarya Bilgi Kültür Merkezi (A Center for Knowledge and Culture) in 2006.

Career
Duran moved to Istanbul Sehir University in 2009. He served there as the head of the Department of Political Science and International Relations. He was a visiting scholar at George Mason University in 2010-2011. In 2013, he was appointed as the general coordinator of SETA's Istanbul branch. Duran was the first coordinator of SETA's Istanbul office and he was replaced by Fahrettin Altun. In 2004, Duran moved to Ankara and became the general director of SETA.

Academic Studies
Duran has been focusing on the transformation of Islamism, Turkish Political Thought, Turkish Domestic Politics, Turkish Foreign Policy and Middle Eastern Politics. He is the author of Türk Parlamento Tarihi [History of Turkish Parliament] (3 volumes) (Ankara: TBMM, 2012) and the coeditor of Dünya Çatışma Bölgeleri I-II [Conflict Regions in the World] (Nobel, 2004, 2010), Dönüşüm Sürecindeki Türkiye [Turkey in Transition] (Alfa, 2007), Ortadoğu Yıllığı 2008 [Middle East Annual] (Küre, 2009) and Türk Dış Politikası Yıllığı Annual for Turkish Foreign Policy published since 2009 annually.

His articles have appeared in Middle Eastern Studies, Journal of Muslim Minority Affairs, Journal of Balkan and Near Eastern Studies, Insight Turkey, the Muslim World, EuroAgenda, Liberal Düşünce, Bilgi, Sivil Toplum. He has contributed to several edited books.

Duran writes a column in Sabah, one of the leading dailies in Turkey, and its English-language sister Daily Sabah.

Views
Duran is known as a critic of political Islam's engagement with the European Union in Turkey. For him, the use of an EU-related language weakened Islamic discourse of political Islam in Turkey. Although this EUropeanized language was a strategy of political Islam in the power struggle against the secular establishment of Turkey, this strategy transformed the identity of political Islam by weakening its Islamic vocabulary.

After his appointment as the director of the SETA, a think tank close to the Justice and Development Party (JDP), Duran turned a prominent and vocal supporter of the JDP government. Ertugrul Ozkok, a fervent critic of the JDP, called Duran as one of "benign" supporters of the JDP.

In July 2019, SETA released an "over 200- page document, which addresses the reports by BBC Turkish, Deutsche Welle Turkish, Voice of America (VoA), Euronews, CRI Turk and the Independent Turkish." The report caused immediate concern that SETA was using the report for "targeting the journalists."

Rectorship Controversy
Duran resigned from his post in Istanbul Sehir University at October 25, 2015 with a protest letter. In this letter, he and his colleagues criticized Istanbul Sehir University administration on the ground that new-appointed rector, Ali Atif Bir, is close to the Gulen Movement and once defended headscarf-ban in Turkey. By directly quoting Bir's statement, "The Council of Higher Education [in Turkey] is fully right in its fight against headscarf. If headscarf enters to universities, Turkey will lose its fight against Sharia", Duran and his colleagues criticized the appointment of Bir as a stark deviation from Istanbul Sehir University's principles based on freedom and equality.

After the resignation of Duran and his two colleagues, a group of student from the University organized a rally during which they carried placards that read "we want our professors back" and "we do not want Ali Atif Bir". In order to appease student protests, Murat Ülker, the Chairman of the Board of Trustees of Istanbul Sehir University posted to his social media account a report about the campaign for "freedom to headscarf" organized in 2007 and one of whose signatories was Ali Atif Bir. However, this did not end the controversy over the appointment of Bir. The University administration stepped back and appointed Cengiz Kallek, a professor on the economic history of early Islamic period, as a new rector at 6 November 2015.

References

Academic staff of Bilkent University
Academic staff of Boğaziçi University
Living people
Turkish political scientists
Turkish social scientists
1971 births